is a single by Japan-based American metal band Animetal USA and Japanese anison singer Hironobu Kageyama. The song serves as the theme song for the Naruto spin-off Rock Lee & His Ninja Pals.

The single peaked at No. 179 on the Oricon's weekly singles chart.

Track listing

Chart positions

References

External links 

 
 

2012 singles
2012 songs
Sony Music Entertainment Japan singles
Naruto songs
Songs written by Marty Friedman